Presidential elections are scheduled to be held in Singapore by 13 September 2023.

Background

The president of Singapore is the head of state of Republic of Singapore. The incumbent president is Halimah Yacob, who took office on 14 September 2017. She is also the first female president in the country's history.

Modelled after the Westminster system, the office is largely ceremonial, with the general direction and control of the Government exercised by the Cabinet led by the prime minister. However, the president has several powers designed to safeguard the national reserves and the integrity of the public service. Such powers include withholding assent to any supply bill that is likely to draw on the reserves which were not accumulated by the Government during its current term of office and refusing to make or revoking appointments to public offices such as Chief Justice, Attorney-General, Chief of Defence Force and Commissioner of Police amongst others. 

The current system of conducting elections for the presidency began with the 1993 presidential election and the swearing-in of Ong Teng Cheong. Prior to that, the president was appointed by Parliament.

There are strict requirements for prospective presidential candidates, and whether a candidate meets the qualifications or not is decided by the Presidential Elections Committee (PEC), who are given the task of issuing a certificate of eligibility (COE) to prospective candidates.

The presidency is required by the Constitution to be non-partisan. Following amendments to the Constitution of Singapore, the next presidential election will be open to candidates of any racial community. The 2017 presidential election was the first to be reserved for a particular racial community under a hiatus-triggered model, and was restricted to candidates from the minority Malay community, who had not held the presidency since 1970.

Electoral system
The president is elected by first-past-the-post voting, with the candidate receiving the most votes winning the election.

Candidates

Potential

Declined

References

Singapore
Presidential elections in Singapore
President